A bank teller (often abbreviated to simply teller) is an employee of a bank whose responsibilities include the handling of customer cash and negotiable instruments. In some places, this employee is known as a cashier or customer representative. Tellers also deal with routine customer service at a branch.

Responsibilities and duties of the bank teller
Being front-line staff they are most likely to detect and stop fraudulent transactions in order to prevent losses at a bank (counterfeit currency and cheques, identity theft, confidence tricks, etc.). The position also requires tellers to be friendly and interact with the customers, providing them with information about customers' accounts and bank services. Tellers typically work from a station, usually located on a teller line. Most stations have a teller system, which includes cash drawers, receipt validator/printers, proof work sorters, and paperwork used for completing bank transactions. These transactions include:
 Check cashing, depositing, transfers, wire transfers
 Savings deposits, withdrawals
 Issuing negotiable items (cashier's checks, traveler's cheques, money orders, federal draft issuances, etc.)
 Payment collecting
 Promotion of the financial institution's products (loans, mortgages, etc.)
 Business referrals (trust, insurance, lending, etc.)
 Cash advances
 Savings bond redemption. Paper savings bonds can no longer be purchased, only electronic bonds are available for purchase now, so banks can no longer issue bonds.
 Resolving customer issues
 Balancing the vault, cash drawers, ATMs, and TAUs
 Batching and Processing Proof Work (On-Us/Not-On-Us Checks, Payment Coupons, Counter Slips, etc.)
 May include ordering products for the customer (cheques, deposit slips, etc.)

Prevalence and history

In the United States, tellers held approximately 608,000 jobs in 2006. Of these, 1 out of 4 worked part-time. Median annual earnings as of May 2006 were $22,140.

The number of tellers in the United States increased from approximately 300,000 in 1970 to approximately 600,000 in 2010. Counterintuitively, a contributing factor may be the introduction of automated teller machines. ATMs let a branch operate with fewer tellers, making it cheaper for banks to open more branches. This likely resulted in more tellers being hired to handle non-automated tasks, but further automation and online banking may reverse this increase.

The increase in online banking has decreased the number of bank tellers.

Public figures who were former bank tellers
Many well-known personalities have worked as bank tellers including: 
 Whoopi Goldberg 
 Ray Romano
 Scott Adams
 William Singe
 John Legend
 Kim Dong-yeon

See also

 Automated teller machine (ATM)
 Front office (finance)
 Cashier

References

Teller
Office work